Masao Kato (born 26 March 1950) is a Japanese weightlifter. He competed in the men's lightweight event at the 1972 Summer Olympics.

References

1950 births
Living people
Japanese male weightlifters
Olympic weightlifters of Japan
Weightlifters at the 1972 Summer Olympics
Place of birth missing (living people)